Kearns Peninsula is a broad ice-covered peninsula between Potaka Inlet and Peale Inlet on the north side of Thurston Island, Antarctica. It was named by the Advisory Committee on Antarctic Names after Lieutenant William H. Kearns, U.S. Navy Reserve, co-pilot of the Operation Highjump PBM Mariner seaplane that crashed on adjacent Noville Peninsula, December 30, 1946. Kearns and five other survivors were rescued on January 12, 1947.

Maps
 Thurston Island – Jones Mountains. 1:500000 Antarctica Sketch Map. US Geological Survey, 1967.
 Antarctic Digital Database (ADD). Scale 1:250000 topographic map of Antarctica. Scientific Committee on Antarctic Research (SCAR). Since 1993, regularly upgraded and updated.

References

Peninsulas of Ellsworth Land